Katerina "Katinka" Faragó (born 16 December 1936) is a Swedish film producer. She was a member of the jury at the 43rd Berlin International Film Festival.

Selected filmography

 Fanny and Alexander (1982)
 The Blessed Ones (1986)
 Katinka' (1988)
 Leningrad Cowboys Go America (1989)
 Good Evening, Mr. Wallenberg (1990)
 Friends, Comrades (1991)
 Önskas (1991)
 Jönssonligan och den svarta diamanten (1992)
 Sunday's Children (1992)
 Sista dansen (1993)
 Tic Tac'' (1997)

References

External links

1936 births
Living people
Swedish film producers
Litteris et Artibus recipients
Austrian emigrants to Sweden
Producers who won the Best Film Guldbagge Award